Karim Izrailov (born 14 March 1987) is a Kyrgyzstani professional footballer. Currently he is playing for Dordoi Bishkek.

Career
Izrailov played for Mash'al Mubarek during the 2010 Uzbek League.

In January 2017, Izrailov went on trial with Dordoi Bishkek, signing a two-year contract with Dordoi Bishkek on 16 January 2017.

Career statistics

International

Statistics accurate as of match played 21 March 2013

References

External links
Profile at TFF

1987 births
Living people
Kyrgyzstani footballers
Kyrgyzstani expatriate footballers
Expatriate footballers in Turkey
FK Dinamo Samarqand players
TP-47 players
Association football midfielders
Kyrgyzstan international footballers